Erinnyis impunctata is a species of moth in the family Sphingidae.

Description 
It was described by Walter Rothschild and Karl Jordan in 1903.

Distribution 
It is known from Peru, Bolivia, Argentina and Venezuela.

Biology 
Adults are probably on wing year round, they have been reported in January in Argentina. Adults nectar at flowers.

References

Erinnyis
Moths described in 1903